Poon Saan is the second largest town on Christmas Island, an external territory of Australia. Ethnic Chinese make up the majority of inhabitants. In Cantonese, Poon Saan (Jyutping: bun3 saan1) means "halfway up the hill". The architecture of Poon Saan reflects the Chinese heritage of the majority of residents in being Singapore style units, rather than the Western style common in Flying Fish Cove.

The Java sparrow has become established on the island with populations near Poon Saan.

Heritage
An area of the settlement, including the Poon Saan Club, Union of Christmas Island Workers office, cinema and several residential blocks, is listed on the Australian Commonwealth Heritage List as the "Poon Saan Group" for its "significance to the Chinese population", "architectural styles imported from Singapore and rarely found in other parts of Australia", and for the "number of structures associated with the inception and development of the union movement on Christmas Island", while the cinema was considered significant for its role as a venue for mass meetings and as "an uncommon example of a relatively intact outdoor cinema".

References

Populated places in Christmas Island